Ken Nyaondo(born January 15, 2002) is a Zambian Mixed Martial Artist and Full Contact Karate practitioner based in South Africa. Ken minted silver medal at the 2022 IMMAF Africa Championships which was held in South Africa.  and He is the three times GFC champion.

References

External links 

 
 

Martial artists
Zambian sportspeople
2002 births
Living people